Manquait plus qu'ça is the debut album from the French actress-turned-singer Sandrine Kiberlain.  It was released on March 14, 2005 by EMI.

Track listing
 La godiche – 3:00
 Y a du monde – 2:42
 J'ai aimé – 3:00
 Placébo – 3:03
 Manquait plus qu'ca – 3:08
 Vos condoléances – 3:34
 M'envoyer des fleurs – 2:35
 Le vent – 3:20
 Le chagrin d'une fille – 2:46
 Le quotidien – 2:56
 Girl – 2:17

Most online shops also include:
 Loin derrière 3:46 as track 12.

Rerelease 
In 2006 the album was rereleased (in CD format) with the following track list:

 Loin derrière (en duo avec Camille Bazbaz) – 3:23
 La godiche – 3:00
 Y a du monde – 2:42
 J'ai aimé – 3:00
 Placébo – 3:03
 Manquait plus qu'ca – 3:07
 Vos condoléances – 3:34
 M'envoyer des fleurs – 2:35
 Le vent – 3:20
 Le chagrin d'une fille – 2:46
 Le quotidien – 2:56
 Girl – 2:20

External links
Official site

2005 albums